The Greater Green River Intergalactic Spaceport is a small public use airstrip about  south of Green River, Wyoming on a mountain known as South Hill. It opened in 1963.

Facilities
It has one runway, 04/22,  feet gravel. The runway is unattended, with no buildings or facilities, except a windsock. The runway has a clear line of sight from the runway ends. Communications are through CTAF and most of the services are from nearby Rock Springs - Sweetwater County Airport.

In the year ending September 30, 2020, the airport had 350 aircraft operations, all general aviation. No aircraft or spacecraft were then based at the airport.

In August 2020, the Wyoming Army National Guard's 133rd Unit completed training at the spaceport through a program called Innovative Readiness Training (IRT).
Through the IRT, military units can apply their skills and resources to benefit local communities during their scheduled training periods.  
The 133rd is an Engineering Company that builds runways when deployed. 
In the past Runway 4/22 had a line of sight issue, but the 133rd was able to work towards resolving this issue and grading Runway 4/22 and the Connector.

Spaceport
On July 5, 1994, Resolution R94-23 of the Green River city council designated this landing field as the "Greater Green River Intergalactic Spaceport", for inhabitants of Jupiter who might wish to take sanctuary in Green River in the event their planet is threatened by collisions from comets or meteors, in apparent reference to the contemporary Comet Shoemaker–Levy 9 impact.

References

External links 
 
 Photos of GGRIS

Spaceports in the United States
Airports in Wyoming
Buildings and structures in Sweetwater County, Wyoming
Green River, Wyoming
Transportation in Sweetwater County, Wyoming
Airports established in 1963